Jawhar Mnari (born 8 November 1976) is a Tunisian former professional footballer who played as a defensive midfielder.

Club career
Mnari was born in Monastir, Tunisia. In 2005, Mnari moved from Espérance to 1. FC Nürnberg. In 2007, he won the DFB-Pokal in Germany with 1. FC Nürnberg and reached the UEFA-Cup through this. He moved to FSV Frankfurt in 2010.

International career
Mnari was capped 44 times and scored three goals for the Tunisia national team. He scored the first goal against Spain in the 2006 World Cup in the 8th minute to help Tunisia take a 1–0 lead. He was part of the squad that won the 2004 African Cup of Nations.

International goals
Scores and results list Tunisia's goal tally first, score column indicates score after each Mnari goal.

Honours
1. FC Nürnberg
DFB-Pokal (2006–07)

Tunisia
 Africa Cup of Nations: 2004

References

External links
 

1976 births
Living people
People from Monastir Governorate
Association football midfielders
Tunisian footballers
Tunisian expatriate footballers
Tunisia international footballers
US Monastir (football) players
Espérance Sportive de Tunis players
1. FC Nürnberg players
FSV Frankfurt players
2005 FIFA Confederations Cup players
2004 African Cup of Nations players
2006 Africa Cup of Nations players
2006 FIFA World Cup players
2008 Africa Cup of Nations players
Bundesliga players
2. Bundesliga players
Expatriate footballers in Germany